The 1919–20 Idaho Vandals men's basketball team represented the University of Idaho during the  college basketball season. The Vandals were led by Ralph Hutchinson, in his only season as Idaho's head basketball coach, and played their home games on campus at the Armory and Gymnasium in Moscow, Idaho.

The Vandals were 11–7 in overall play.

The state high school tournament (now IHSAA) was hosted by the university in mid-March.

Dave MacMillan became the head coach after this season.

References

External links
Sports Reference – Idaho Vandals: 1919–20 basketball season
Gem of the Mountains: 1921 (spring 1920) University of Idaho yearbook – 1919–20 basketball season
Idaho Argonaut – student newspaper – 1920 editions

Idaho Vandals men's basketball seasons
Idaho
Idaho
Idaho